Russell Crow (born 17 September 1941) is a former Australian rules footballer for  in the Victorian Football League (VFL).

Playing career
He played 158 VFL matches for Fitzroy between 1960 and 1973.

In 1971 Crow made his representative debut for Victoria when he played in the interstate match versus South Australia on 12 June 1971. He was chosen in the squad to represent Victoria at the 1972 Perth Carnival, but had to withdraw due to injury.

References

External links
 
 

1941 births
Fitzroy Football Club players
Warracknabeal Football Club players
Australian rules footballers from Victoria (Australia)
Living people